is a Japanese idol, singer, model, and presenter, represented by Twin Planet. She is a member of the girl group STU48. She is the first member of the group to hold a solo concert and release a photo book, and has thrice been the lead performer of the title songs of the group's singles.

Biography

2012–2016: Actor's School Hiroshima 
Ishida has worked as a model since childhood. In 2012, she was admitted as a 26th generation student of Actor's School Hiroshima. While a student, she became a member of the idol groups peony and MAX♡GIRLS managed by the school. That year, she also won the Grand Prix in the Fairies NEXT auditions, organized by Rising Production to form a junior unit to the girl group Fairies, but the unit never debuted.

2017–2019: STU48, AKB48 Group, overseas work 
On March 19, 2017, Ishida passed the audition for STU48's first generation and graduated from ASH the next day. She later became the leader of STU48's travel and beauty subunit Charming Trip, formed in October 2018. Although she is not an exclusive model, she has been featured on several beauty columns and booklets and aims to introduce STU48 to more female fans through beauty activities.

In June 2018, Ishida ranked #99 in the AKB48 Senbatsu Sousenkyo, being one of only two STU48 original members to rank in, the other being Yumiko Takino at #74 (Nana Okada, who ranked fifth, is concurrently an AKB48 member). In 2019, Ishida became a member of the subunit Sucheese, which consisted of the "next generation leaders" of AKB48 and its five Japanese sister groups, and their song "Okujō Kara Sakebu" was included in AKB48's 55th single, "Jiwaru Days". Ishida and Takino also represented STU48 in the lineup for the title song of AKB48's 56th single, "Sustainable", and performed with them at the 70th NHK Kōhaku Uta Gassen on December 31. 

In October 2019, Yamaguchi Broadcasting aired the television program , which featured Ishida and Takino's visit to Indonesia as Setouchi Region tourism ambassadors.

2020: Solo activities, joining Twin Planet 
On January 24, 2020, Ishida held her first solo concert at Tokyo Dome City Hall. A total of 29 songs were performed, and Ishida read a letter to her fans in the end announcing her goal of becoming the "strongest idol".

In March, Ishida's first self-titled web series, was launched on Hulu Japan. It features Ishida and several other STU48 members trying their hands at various part-time jobs and ran for four episodes.

On July 7, 2020, Ishida announced during a solo performance at the STU48 Theater that she has signed to Wild Planet, a section for actors and actresses within the agency Twin Planet, with the intention to pursue acting in addition to her current activities. SKE48 member Akari Suda, who is signed to the same agency, offered her congratulations in a recorded video message.

On October 26, Ishida announced that her photobook, photographed in Hiroshima and Okinawa prefectures, would be released on December 2. Titled , it would be both the first solo photobook and the first swimsuit photoshoot by an STU48 original member. The book placed fifth in the Oricon photobook sales ranking for the week of its release, with approximately 4,266 copies sold.

Ishida was known to perform live streaming on the SHOWROOM platform every day. As of August 2020, she had reached 1200 consecutive days of live streaming.

2021–present: STU48 center, stage acting debut 
Ishida became title song center (lead performer) for the first time in STU48's sixth single, "Hitorigoto de Kataru Kurainara" (2021). She was also elected into the group's fan-voted Setouchi PR Unit, which would perform the song  included in the single. She became a title song center again for "Hana wa Dare no Mono?" (2022), in which the center position would be rotated for each performance between her and fellow members Yumiko Takino and Mai Nakamura in a novel "triangle center" system. She was also elected as the leader of the second iteration, or "Season 2", of the Setouchi PR Unit.

In December 2021, Ishida represented STU48 in a National Police Agency campaign to combat phone fraud.

Ishida made her acting debut in July 2022 in a stage adaptation of the novel Parade by Shuichi Yoshida.

On November 23, Ishida became the first AKB48 Group member to appear on the YouTube channel The First Take with a solo performance of "Hana wa Dare no Mono?".

Reception 
In 2015, About ASH described Ishida as the "sleeping talent" of Actor's School Hiroshima, referring to her passing the Fairies NEXT audition not long after joining the school.

In 2020, Tokyo Sports mentioned that Ishida's appeal lies in the contrast between her "innocent" looks and her "unexpected" variety of skills, including dancing. She is also described as a genuine classic idol, in a time when idols tend to aim for a more modern "cool" image, with the potential to surpass Mayu Watanabe. Meanwhile, Encount and Entame Next similarly praised her perseverance and strong relationship with fans.

Personal life 
Ishida's family home is in Kumano, which she described as a "mountainous" area some distance from Hiroshima city. She has an older brother. Her family has always been supportive of her entertainment career, and it was her father who recommended that she audition for STU48. 

Ishida's role model is Yuki Kashiwagi.

Discography 
Ishida has performed in all STU48 title songs and has been the center (lead performer) of "Hitorigoto de Kataru Kurainara" (2021) and "Iki o Suru Kokoro" (2023), as well as co-center in "Hana wa Dare no Mono?" (2022). Other notable appearances include:

 "Setouchi no Koe" (AKB48 single "Negaigoto no Mochigusare" B-side, 2017), first STU48 music release
 "Nami ga Tsutaeru Mono"" (AKB48 single "Sentimental Train" B-side, 2018), performed by the "10th World General Election Commemorative Group" (ranks 81-100) of the 10th AKB48 Group general election
 "'Suki' no Tane" (AKB48 single "Sentimental Train" B-side, 2018), performed by the top 16 participants of the 2018 Showroom Appeal Event (online side contest of the 10th AKB48 Group general election)
 "Koi wa Kebyo chu" ("Daisuki na Hito", 2019), first time as center, first Charming Trip music release
 "Okujo Kara Sakebu" (AKB48 single "Jiwaru Days" B-side, 2019), performed with Sucheese
 "Sustainable" (2019), first AKB48 title song participation
 "Omoide My Friend" ("Shitsuren, Arigatō", 2020), performed with 1st Campus, AKB48 Group selected young members unit

Bibliography

Appearances

Television 
 AKBingo! (Nippon TV, 2018–2019), irregular appearances
 Setobingo! (Nippon TV, 2018)
 , chapter 2 (Yamaguchi Broadcasting, October 2019)
  (Hulu Japan, 2020)

Concert 
  (Tokyo Dome City Hall, January 24, 2020)

Stage play 

  (2022), Kotomi Ogakiuchi

References

External links 

 Twin Planet profile 
 STU48 profile 

STU48 members
Musicians from Hiroshima Prefecture
Japanese idols
Japanese women singers
Living people
2002 births